{{Infobox concert tour|concert_tour_name= The Rock of the Westies Tour|album=Rock of the Westies|artist=Elton John|start_date=29 September 1975|end_date=26 October 1975|number_of_legs=1|number_of_shows=17 in the United States  2 in Canada  19 in Total|last_tour=Caribou Tour (1974)|this_tour=Rock of the Westies Tour (1975)|next_tour=Louder Than Concorde Tour (1976)}}

The Rock of the Westies Tour was a North American concert tour by English musician and composer Elton John, in support of his 10th studio album Rock of the Westies. The tour included a total of 17 shows across the United States and Canada.

Tour

John and his new band (now without Jeff "Skunk" Baxter but including backing vocalists Cindy Bullens, Jon Joyce and Ken Gold) warmed up for their Rock of the Westies Tour by playing five shows in three nights at The Troubadour nightclub in Los Angeles, the place where John had first played  in America five years before. Kiki Dee joined in on these shows, which were benefit concerts for the Jules Stein Foundation and were commemorated by the promotional book "Five Years of Fun".

The western leg of the US tour began on 29 September 1975, at the San Diego Sports Arena, and finished up on 25 and 26 October at Dodger Stadium in Los Angeles…the first time a rock act had played there since The Beatles in 1966. These two shows, the culmination of "Elton John Week"'' in the city and played in front of 55,000 people each night, were filmed for British television and remain some of the most famous concerts John has ever given. Following opening sets by Emmylou Harris and Joe Walsh, Elton John and the band were later joined on stage by Billie Jean King and the 45-member James Cleveland Choir singing on selected numbers.

Tour dates

Set list

 "Your Song"
 "I Need You to Turn To"
 "Border Song"
 "Take Me to the Pilot"
 "Dan Dare (Pilot of the Future)"
 "Country Comfort"
 "Levon"
 "Rocket Man"
 "Hercules"
 "Empty Sky"
 "Funeral for a Friend/Love Lies Bleeding"
 "Goodbye Yellow Brick Road"
 "Bennie and the Jets"
 "Harmony"
 "Dixie Lily"
 "Captain Fantastic and the Brown Dirt Cowboy"
 "The Bitch Is Back"
 "Someone Saved My Life Tonight"
 "Don't Let the Sun Go Down on Me"
 "Lucy in the Sky with Diamonds" (The Beatles cover)
 "(Gotta Get A) Meal Ticket"
 "I Saw Her Standing There" (The Beatles cover)
 "Island Girl"
 "Philadelphia Freedom"
 "We All Fall in Love Sometimes"
 "Curtains"
 "Saturday Night's Alright for Fighting"
Encore:
 "Pinball Wizard" (The Who cover)

Tour band
 Elton John – lead vocals, piano
 Davey Johnstone – lead guitar, acoustic guitar, backing vocals
 Caleb Quaye – rhythm guitar, backing vocals
 Kenny Passarelli – bass guitar, backing vocals
 Roger Pope – drums
 James Newton Howard – keyboards, electric piano, synthesizer
 Ray Cooper – percussion
 Cindy Bullens – backing vocals
 Jon Joyce – backing vocals
 Ken Gold – backing vocals

References

External links

 Information Site with Tour Dates

Elton John concert tours
1975 concert tours